Wygnanów may refer to the following places:
Wygnanów, Gmina Opoczno in Łódź Voivodeship (central Poland)
Wygnanów, Gmina Sławno in Łódź Voivodeship (central Poland)
Wygnanów, Lublin Voivodeship (east Poland)
Wygnanów, Lesser Poland Voivodeship (south Poland)
Wygnanów, Świętokrzyskie Voivodeship (south-central Poland)
Wygnanów, Masovian Voivodeship (east-central Poland)